Golnuš Xâleqi (6 January 1941 – 14 February 2021; گلنوش خالقی) was a Persian-American musician and conductor. She was the first Persian woman conductor.

Xâleqi was born in Tehran and studied at the Persian National Music Conservatory, Mozarteum Salzburg and the University of Wisconsin.
From 1975 to 1979 she was the conductor of National Iranian Radio & Television Choir, known as "Hamâvazân". Shortly after the 1979 Revolution she moved to the United States. In 1985 she founded Ruhollâh Xâleqi Orchestra to preserve Persian music in the United States. The orchestra's activities was halted in 1990 due to financial difficulties.

Golnuš Xâleqi died in Washington, D.C., United States on 15 February 2021. She was 80. Xâleqi is survived by her husband, American organist Stephen Ackert and two sons, Râmin (David) and Julian.

Works
Compositions:

 Azadi (Freedom) Anthem (1979) for choir. Text: Fereydoun Moshiri
 Concerto for Santur and Orchestra (1988)
 Piano works based on Persian folk music and melodies by Darvish-Khan, Morteza Neydavood, etc.

Arrangements:
 Mey-e Naab / Pure Wine (1991), Arrangements of Rouhollah Khaleghi's works for voice, choir and orchestra.

Books:
 "Ey Iran: Memorial volume of Ruhollāh Khāleqi". Mahoor Institute, Tehran, 2006.
 "Rouhollah Khaleghi's Compositions & Arrangements". Mahoor Institute, Tehran, 2019.

References

External links
 An Interview with Golnoush Khaleghi: BBC Persian TV (with English subtitles)

Iranian women musicians
1941 births
2021 deaths
People from Tehran
Iranian emigrants to the United States